This was the first edition of the tournament.

Catherine Harrison and Sabrina Santamaria won the title, defeating Kayla Cross and Marina Stakusic in the final, 7–6(7–2), 6–4.

Seeds

Draw

Draw

References

External Links
Main Draw

Calgary National Bank Challenger - Doubles